James Nelson Harrell (September 3, 1918 – February 1, 2000), also known as James N. Harrell, was an American actor.

Life and career
He was born in Waco, Texas, to Margaret Teny and Jefferson Whitfield Harrell, Chair of the Baylor University Mathematics Department, graduated from Waco High School and Baylor University. He held a master's degree in Drama from Trinity University. He studied acting at the original Baylor Theater with Paul Baker in the 1930s and in 1940 was invited to join Michael Chekhov's Acting Studio in Ridgefield, Connecticut. He toured the East Coast with that company and was playing Twelfth Night when the attack on Pearl Harbor brought the United States into World War II, and most plays closed. Harrell served in the United States Army for four years in a tank company, in Headquarters Eighth Service Command, in Special Services, and in Occupied Japan. James Harrell, also known as "little Jimmy Harrell from Waco, Texas", appeared in over 75 film productions; feature films and television. He taught acting at the Dallas Theater Center and had leading roles in numerous productions, including 'Anse Bundren' in Journey to Jefferson, which toured Paris, Belgium and Germany. He also taught stage and film acting at Southwest Texas State University for 24 years, retiring in 1994 as an associate professor. He had roles in such films as JFK, Varsity Blues, Michael, Hope Floats, Leap of Faith, Paper Moon, The Texas Chainsaw Massacre 2, Flesh and Bone, and Noon Wine. He worked often with Sam Shepard, Barry Corbin, Tommy Lee Jones, Jeff Bridges, Gary Busey, Roberts Blossom, Wilford Brimley, James Gammon and Harlan Jordan. He died in 2000 from a heart attack.

Partial filmography
 1970 A Bullet for Pretty Boy as Mr. Sam Floyd
 1972 Encounter with the Unknown as Brother Taylor
 1973 Paper Moon as The Minister
 1974 The Sugarland Express as Mark Fenno
 1974 Don't Hang Up as Dr. Crawther
 1975 The Great Waldo Pepper as Farmer
 1975 Race with the Devil as Gun Shop Owner
 1975 Mackintosh and T.J. as Doolen
 1976 A Small Town in Texas as Old Codger
 1977 Outlaw Blues as Cop Chauffeur
 1977 Rolling Thunder as Grandpa
 1978 The Whole Shootin' Match as Rhonda Lynn's Father
 1980 Urban Cowboy as Minister At Gravesite
 1980 Resurrection as "Doc" Lurkin
 1981 Raggedy Man as Ticket Taker
 1984 Country Jim, Bank Officer
 1986 The Texas Chainsaw Massacre 2 as Cut-Rite Manager
 1987 Nadine as Deacon
 1989 Riverbend as McBride
 1989 Lost Angels as Shelby
 1990 The Hot Spot as Elderly Man
 1990 Texasville as Odessa Oil Man
 1991 JFK as Sam Holland 
 1992 Leap of Faith as Ramsey
 1993 Flesh and Bone as Woody
 1996 Carried Away as Pastor
 1996 A Family Thing as Earl Pilcher Sr.
 1996 Michael as Old Geezer #1
 1998 Hope Floats as Harry Calvert
 1999 Varsity Blues as Murray
 1999 A Slipping-Down Life as Doctor (final film role)

External links

1918 births
2000 deaths
Male actors from Texas
Trinity University (Texas) alumni
20th-century American male actors
Waco High School alumni